Geophilus easoni is a species of soil centipede in the family Geophilidae found throughout Britain and Ireland, though its range extends through western France to at least the foothills of the Pyrenees. Until 2001, it was considered synonymous with G. carpophagus, and most pre-2001 records probably refer to G. easoni. It's typically shorter than G. carpophagus (up to 40 mm), with fewer leg pairs (between 47-51), uniform tan/chestnut coloring, and a greater size and number of coxal pores, as well as a darkly pigmented mid-piece of the labrum which bears blunt teeth. Specimens in north-western Iberia typically have a wider range of leg pairs (between 47-55). It nests on the ground surface under stones and dead wood.

References 

easoni